Lawrence McCeney "Biff" Jones (October 8, 1895 – February 12, 1980) was an American college football player, coach, and athletics administrator. He served as a head coach at the United States Military Academy, Louisiana State University (LSU), the University of Oklahoma, and the University of Nebraska, compiling a career coaching record of 87–33–15. Jones was inducted into the College Football Hall of Fame as a coach in 1954.

Coaching career
Biff Jones graduated from the U. S. Military Academy at West Point in 1917, and served as an artillery lieutenant in France during the rest of World War I. He returned to West Point in 1926, where he served for four years as head coach of the football team, then was assigned by the army to Louisiana State University to coach the LSU Tigers football team, beginning with the 1932 season.

At LSU, Jones was head coach for three seasons, and led the team to a Southern Conference Championship in 1932. He resigned after the 1934 season after a heated exchange with noted LSU supporter, Louisiana senator Huey P. Long. In the last game of the season, Long was displeased after the team had lost two straight games and was trailing at halftime to Oregon. Long decided to give a motivational speech to the team at halftime, but was turned away by Jones at the locker room door. The ensuing argument ended with Jones declaring to resign, effective at the end of the game. LSU won the game 14–13. The army then assigned him to serve as head coach of the Oklahoma Sooners football team, where he served during 1935 and 1936. This assignment ended when the military transferred him to a new position that had no connection with football.

Jones retired from the Army with the rank of major in 1937, intending to concentrate on his football coaching career. In 1937, he left the Oklahoma Sooners to coach their rival, the Nebraska Cornhuskers, replacing coach Dana X. Bible. Jones remained at Nebraska for five years a tallied a 28–14–4 mark. He led Nebraska to its first bowl game, the 1941 Rose Bowl, and also coached the second-ever televised college football game. Jones left Nebraska when he was recalled up to service during World War II.

Death
Biff Jones died February 13, 1980, at his home in Chevy Chase, Maryland. His wife had died in 1978.

Head coaching record

Notes

References

Bibliography

External links
 
 

1895 births
1980 deaths
American football tackles
Army Black Knights athletic directors
Army Black Knights football players
Army Black Knights football coaches
LSU Tigers football coaches
Oklahoma Sooners athletic directors
Oklahoma Sooners football coaches
Nebraska Cornhuskers athletic directors
Nebraska Cornhuskers football coaches
College Football Hall of Fame inductees
American military personnel of World War I
United States Army personnel of World War II
United States Army officers
Coaches of American football from Washington, D.C.
Players of American football from Washington, D.C.